Politik may also refer to:

 Politics (Swedish, German, Danish and Indonesian: Politik)
 Realpolitik, politics or diplomacy based primarily on considerations of given circumstances and factors
 JHU Politik, in the List of Johns Hopkins University student organizations

 "Politik", a song on the album A Rush of Blood to the Head by Coldplay
 Politik, the political news website by New Zealand journalist

See also
 
 Politika (disambiguation)